Gervais High School (formerly Gervais Union High School) is a public high school in Gervais, Oregon, United States. It is a part of the Gervais School District.

Academics

Sports
Gervais High School is a member of the OSAA 2A-2 Tri-River Conference.

References

High schools in Marion County, Oregon
Public high schools in Oregon
1860 establishments in Oregon
Gervais, Oregon
School districts established in 1860